The Movement for the Social Evolution of Black Africa–Boganda (MESAN–Boganda) is a political party in the Central African Republic.

History
The party was established in February 1993.

In 2010 it joined the Presidential Majority alliance in preparation for the 2011 general elections. MESAN-Boganda nominated five candidates for the 105 seats in the National Assembly, winning one of the alliance's 11 seats.

See also
 Movement for the Social Evolution of Black Africa

References

1993 establishments in the Central African Republic
Political parties established in 1993
Political parties in the Central African Republic